Nathaniel Bacon (12 December 1593 – 1660) was an English Puritan lawyer, writer and politician who sat in the House of Commons at various times between 1645 and 1660. He was Judge of the High Court of Admiralty 1653 to 1654.

Life

Bacon was the son of Sir Edward Bacon of Shrubland, Barham, son of Queen Elizabeth's Lord Keeper of the Great Seal, Sir Nicholas Bacon, by his first wife, Jane Ferneley (d.1552). He was educated at Christ's College, Cambridge. In 1617 he was called to the bar.

Bacon was a Parliamentarian, active in support of the New Model Army from 1644, Bacon became Member of Parliament for Cambridge University in 1645, as a recruiter to the Long Parliament until he was excluded after Pride's Purge.

Bacon was elected MP for Ipswich for the First Protectorate Parliament in 1654, along with his brother Francis Bacon and the two represented Ipswich together until his death. He also served as an Admiralty Judge and Master of Requests (1657).

Works

The Fearefull Estate of Francis Spira (1638)
The remark
Man knows the beginning of sin, but who bounds the issues thereof?
appears in The Fearefull Estate of Francis Spira

It is cited by John Bunyan in Grace Abounding, as being by Francesco Spiera, but is misattributed, and is really Bacon's, from this work on Speira.

Historical Discourse (1647–51)
Bacon's An Historical Discourse of the Uniformity of the Government of England has been described as the first historical work on Norman England to argue closely from sources, and as "the classical statement of the thesis of Anglo-Saxon liberties". He "presented the ... Saxons as a free people governed by laws made by themselves". Glenn Burgess describes it as "a work of considerable scholarship as well as a piece of political propaganda". It argued continuity of the kingship of William the Conqueror with that of previous kings. It was generally aristocratic and republican in tone, strongly anti-clerical, favouring government by an elected council.

The Annals of Ipswich (1654)
The Annals of Ipswich' constitute a significant contribution to the history of Ipswich, and mark out Bacon's capabilities as a historian.

Family

Bacon married twice: firstly Elizabeth, daughter of Robert Maydston of Boxted, Essex, and widow of Edward Glascock of Great Horkesley, Essex (no children) and secondly Susan, daughter of William Holloway, clothier, of East Bergholt, Suffolk, and widow of Matthew Alefounder, clothier, of Dedham, Essex with whom he had four sons and five daughters. His brother was Francis Bacon, the Ipswich MP.

ReferencesConcise Dictionary of National BiographyUniversity of Calgary Library (Special Collections)
 John Langton Sanford, Studies and Illustrations of the Great Rebellion'' (1858) p. 278

Notes

External link

 

1593 births
1660 deaths
Members of the Parliament of England (pre-1707) for Ipswich
Members of the pre-1707 Parliament of England for the University of Cambridge
Roundheads
Politics of Suffolk
17th-century English Puritans
English male non-fiction writers
17th-century English lawyers
17th-century English historians
Nathaniel
English MPs 1640–1648
English MPs 1654–1655
English MPs 1656–1658
English MPs 1659
English MPs 1660